Molino dei Torti is a comune (municipality) in the Province of Alessandria in the Italian region Piedmont, located about  east of Turin and about  northeast of Alessandria. Molino dei Torti borders the following municipalities: Alzano Scrivia, Casei Gerola, Castelnuovo Scrivia, Guazzora, and Isola Sant'Antonio.

Demographic evolution

References

Cities and towns in Piedmont